Catholicos Zacharias I of Armenia was the Catholicos of the Armenian Apostolic Church between 855 and 876. During his reign a severe earthquake rocked Dvin, during which Zacharias offered powerful prayers. It is said his prayers protected Dvin's church from damage. He died in the twenty-second year of his rule and was buried in Dvin's "cemetery of the holy fathers".

Catholicoi of Armenia
876 deaths
Year of birth unknown
9th-century Armenian people
9th-century Oriental Orthodox archbishops